VectorBase is one of the five Bioinformatics Resource Centers (BRC) funded by the National Institute of Allergy and Infectious Diseases (NIAID), a component of the National Institutes of Health (NIH), which is an agency of the United States Department of Health and Human Services. VectorBase is  focused on invertebrate vectors of human pathogens working with the sequencing centers and the research community to curate vector genomes (mainly genome annotation).

Genomes covered in the VectorBase database
 Aedes aegypti
 Anopheles gambiae
 Culex quinquefasciatus
 Ixodes scapularis
 Pediculus humanus
 Rhodnius prolixus

Tools available through the VectorBase site
 Genome browser
 Community annotation system
 Microarray and gene expression repository
 Controlled vocabularies for anatomy, insecticide resistance and vector-borne diseases (malaria and dengue fever)
 BLAST searches for all covered genomes

See also
 Vectors in epidemiology

References

External links
 vectorbase.org
 Bioinformatics Resource Centers The NIAID page describing the goals and activities of the BRCs
 Pathogen Portal Hub site for the five BRCs; provides summary information
VectorBase genome browsers
 Aedes aegypti genome browser at VectorBase
 Anopheles gambiae genome browser at VectorBase
 Culex quinquefasciatus genome browser at VectorBase
 Ixodes scapularis genome browser at VectorBase
 Pediculus humanus genome browser at VectorBase
 Rhodnius prolixus genome browser at VectorBase

Biological databases
Online databases
Biology websites
Epidemiology organizations